The Grachtenboek (Canal Book) is a book of engraved plates with architecturally correct renditions of housefronts on the canals of Amsterdam, most notably the Herengracht (Gentlemen's canal) and Keizersgracht (Emperor's canal). It was an invention of Caspar Philips that was published in installments between 1768 and 1771 with 1400 engravings based on his and others' drawings.

On the basis of these scale drawings, the 18th century state of the facades along the Herengracht and Keizersgracht can be seen. There have been numerous reprints by city publishers as well as commercial companies.

The book was originally intended as a guide for carpenters, masons, stonemasons, painters and blacksmiths. The book is especially known today for the role it has played in the 20th-century reconstruction and restoration of Amsterdam canal houses by the historic preservation committee, Stadsherstel Amsterdam.

References

 Pages Pages out of the book with photos from today
 Article on Amsterdam city website shows miniatures of the block-long fold-outs from the book

1768 books
Dutch non-fiction books
Architecture books